"Dixieland Delight" is a 1983 song written by Ronnie Rogers, and recorded by American country music band Alabama. It was released in January 1983 as the lead-off single from their album The Closer You Get..., which was released in March of the same year.

The song would reach No. 1 on the Billboard Hot Country Songs list amongst the release of the album in April of 1983. After its release, the song became a college football tradition within the Southeastern Conference, most notably within the Alabama Crimson Tide football fanbase.

Background and writing
Songwriter Ronnie Rogers, who previously had hits with Ed Bruce, Dave Dudley, Tanya Tucker and others, recalled to country music journalist Tom Roland that the idea for "Dixieland Delight" came to him while driving on U.S. Route 11W, a rural highway through Grainger County, Tennessee. The song's first line ("Rollin' down a backwoods, Tennessee byway; one arm on the wheel") soon led into an image of the main character's other arm wrapped around his girlfriend and - with a long, hard work week at an end - envisioning a weekend of fun and relaxation with her.

When Alabama recorded the song in 1982 for The Closer You Get, it differed substantially from the acoustic demo cut by Rogers.

Content
The song's title refers to the girlfriend of the singer. Later in the song, Rogers conjures up images of various forest animals (e.g. a white-tailed buck deer and a red-tailed hawk) and how they bring peace to him, before returning to how the main character plans to become intimate with his girlfriend ("Home-grown country girl, gonna give me a whirl") during their weekend outing, in a truck in a meadow.

The song picks up the tempo somewhat with a fiddle bridge before a reprisal of the refrain.

Music video
A music video was filmed for the song, and was directed by David Hogan. Production for the music video of "Dixieland Delight" took place in the area of Fort Payne, Alabama.

Chart performance
In April of 1983, "Dixieland Delight" became Alabama's ninth No. 1 song on Billboard magazine'''s Hot Country Singles chart.

 Legacy 
"Dixieland Delight" is one of the band Alabama's most enduring singles, and is closely associated with 1980s country music as a whole. The song has been referenced by Brad Paisley in his 2011 single "Old Alabama", by Midland in 2017's "Make a Little", Russell Dickerson's 2017 hit "Every Little Thing", Niko Moon 2020 hit "Good Time", and the 2021 Walker Hayes song "Fancy Like". The single edit is included in several of Alabama's greatest hits collections, including For the Record. The full-length album version is included on the band's second greatest hits album.

In 2018, the song's publishing rights—once owned by two different companies, but later solely reverted to Rogers—were sold to Downtown Music, a global independent rights management and music services company. Billboard columnist Tom Roland considered the deal unusual, citing it as a rare example of a single song deal. Roland noted that Downtown "expects to garner favorable placements and higher visibility by highlighting its attributes."

In 2019, the Rolling Stone, in their 25 Best Songs About the South ranking, would place "Dixieland Delight" seventh on the list, with the Rolling Stone describing it as an example of "high-octane, country-rock number with a hint of bluegrass that are so distinctly from the lower half of the Mason-Dixon they smell like whiskey and wisteria."

 University of Alabama tradition 

In an article for the American Songwriter'', immediately after the song was released, the song would catch on like "the wave" with the University of Alabama fanbase; particularly its football fanbase, as "It just [made] sense...  Alabama, the country trio, and Alabama, the college football team, have more than a name in common. They both have pride: in where they came from and in being the best," referring to the relative dominance and success of the Alabama Crimson Tide in American college football.

The song has become a staple at the University of Alabama, played regularly at Crimson Tide home football games during the intermission between the third and fourth quarters of games. Throughout its time as a tradition the University of Alabama, fans made chants to sing throughout the song. These chants would later become controversial, as profanity was used in the chants; specifically, a widely-used chant had fans chanting after the line "a little turtle dovin' on a Mason-Dixon night" profanities at their college rivals, especially towards major rival Auburn University, with many saying "Fuck Auburn!". While popular with the student fanbase, the chant drew complaints from other fans and officials. As a result, Alabama Assistance Director of Marketing Ryan Majercik directed that the university drop the tradition at the end of 2014 until further notice. The song was reinstated three years later, with a plea from university officials to chant a modified version, saying "Beat Auburn!".

The song has been used by other universities as a way to mock the University of Alabama. The University of Tennessee has poked fun at the University of Alabama for using the song as an Alabama tradition numerous times, with many making fun of the fact that "Dixieland Delight" was written about the state of Tennessee. The song has been played at Neyland Stadium, the University of Tennessee's stadium during wins against the University of Alabama, most recently in 2022 after breaking a 15-year losing streak against Alabama. Other universities have also created chants parodying Alabama's chant for the song, with the chant being flipped to say "Fuck 'Bama!"

Charts

Weekly charts

Year-end charts

Certifications

See also
Morris, Edward, "Alabama," Contemporary Books Inc., Chicago, 1985

References

External links
 Lyrics of this song at Genius

1982 songs
1983 singles
Alabama (American band) songs
Songs written by Ronnie Rogers
Song recordings produced by Harold Shedd
RCA Records singles
Songs about Tennessee
Songs about the American South